Lois June Nettleton (August 16, 1927 – January 18, 2008) was an American film, stage, radio, and television actress. She received three Primetime Emmy Award nominations and won two Daytime Emmy Awards.

Early life
Lois Nettleton was born on August 16, 1927 in Oak Park, Illinois, to Virginia and Edward L. Nettleton. She was also raised by her maternal aunt's family. She attended Senn High School, where she was a classmate of Lee Stern's, and Goodman School of Drama at the Art Institute of Chicago (now at DePaul University). She was Miss Chicago of 1948 and a semifinalist at the Miss America 1948 Pageant. After performing to favorable reviews with Geraldine Page in repertory theatre at the New Lake Zurich Playhouse (Lake Zurich, Illinois) in 1946 and with the Woodstock Players (Woodstock, Illinois) the following year, her professional acting career began in 1949. She understudied Barbara Bel Geddes in the original Broadway production of Tennessee Williams' Cat on a Hot Tin Roof and appeared on television in a production of "Flowers from a Stranger" on Westinghouse Studio One on the CBS network in 1949.

Career

Radio
Nettleton played Patsy in the soap opera The Brighter Day.

Television and Emmy Award nominations
She performed in dozens of guest-starring roles on television shows, including The Twilight Zone (episode "The Midnight Sun", 1961), Naked City, Route 66, Mr. Novak, The Alfred Hitchcock Hour (episode "The Dark Pool", 1963), The Eleventh Hour, Hawaii Five-O, Dr. Kildare, Twelve O'Clock High, The Fugitive, The F.B.I., Cannon, Bonanza, Gunsmoke (starring in 1961 as the title character in season-seven, episode 12’s "Nina’s Revenge", where she played an abused wife driven to murder after finally finding love), The Virginian, and Daniel Boone. In 1973, she appeared on The Mary Tyler Moore Show as Lou Grant's new boss, Barbara Coleman.
She appeared in the pilot episode of The Eddie Capra Mysteries in 1978, and in hit TV miniseries, such as Washington: Behind Closed Doors and Centennial, as the murderous Maude Wendell.

In 1987, she portrayed  Penny Vanderhof Sycamore on the TV series version of the Kaufman and Hart comedy play You Can't Take It with You with Harry Morgan and Richard Sanders. She was a regular celebrity guest on various versions of the game show Pyramid from the 1970s through 1991.

Nettleton won two Emmy Awards during her career. She won one for her role as Susan B. Anthony in the television film The American Woman: Profiles in Courage (1977), and for "A Gun for Mandy" (1983), which was an episode of the religious anthology Insight. She received an Emmy Award nomination for Outstanding Guest Actress in a Comedy Series for the Golden Girls episode "Isn't It Romantic?". She also received Emmy nominations for her work in the TV movie Fear on Trial (1975) (Outstanding Supporting Actress in a Miniseries or Special) and for a recurring role on the series In the Heat of the Night in 1989 (Outstanding Supporting Actress in a Drama Series). Nettleton appeared in a 2006 Christmas TV movie special titled The Christmas Card.

Stage
A life member of the Actors Studio, Nettleton made her Broadway debut in the 1949 production of Dalton Trumbo's play, The Biggest Thief in Town. She appeared in a short-lived off-Broadway production of Look Charlie, which was written by her future husband, humorist Jean Shepherd. It opened for three performances in late December 1958 and closed after several more the following February.

She received critical praise for her performance as Blanche DuBois in a 1973 revival of A Streetcar Named Desire. Nettleton was nominated for a Tony Award for her performance as Amy in a 1976 revival of They Knew What They Wanted. Her other stage credits include Broadway productions of Darkness at Noon and Silent Night, Lonely Night. She continued to act onstage into her 70s. Her final stage performance was in 2004, in an off-Broadway play, How to Build a Better Tulip.

Voice acting
Nettleton appeared in episodes of the CBS Radio Mystery Theater. In her later years, she did several voice roles for Disney, such as Disney's House of Mouse, Mickey's House of Villains (as Maleficent), and Herc's Adventures.

Personal life and death
Nettleton was the first caller to Jean Shepherd's late-night radio program on WOR, later becoming his third wife. She became a regular guest, known to listeners as "the Listener". They appeared together in Shepherd's off-Broadway theater piece Look, Charlie!, which opened in December 1958. They married on December 3, 1960, in Tarrytown, New York. They reportedly divorced in 1967. She never remarried or had children.

Nettleton made her last public appearance in August 2007 at the Twilight Zone convention in Hasbrouck Heights, New Jersey. Five months later, in January 2008, she died in Woodland Hills, California, at the age of 80 from a brain tumor. She was interred in New York City's Saint Raymond's Cemetery.

In popular culture

A highly fictionalized version of her appears in James Ellroy's 2021 novel Widespread Panic.

Filmography

Movies

Television

Video games

References

External links

1927 births
2008 deaths
Actresses from Illinois
Actresses from Los Angeles
American film actresses
American stage actresses
American television actresses
American voice actresses
Deaths from lung cancer in California
Miss America 1940s delegates
Actors from Oak Park, Illinois
Burials at Saint Raymond's Cemetery (Bronx)
20th-century American actresses
21st-century American women